The 2017–18 Bendigo Spirit season is the 11th season for the franchise in the Women's National Basketball League (WNBL).

Roster

Standings

Results

Pre-season

Regular season

Signings

Returning

Incoming

Awards

In-season

References

External links
Bendigo Spirit Official website

2017–18 WNBL season
WNBL seasons by team
2017–18 in Australian basketball
Basketball,Bendigo Spirit
Basketball,Bendigo Spirit